Studio Vibes was a South Korean show. It aired on tvN on Wednesdays at 23:00 (KST).

Format 
Ten young musicians move together and are left to do whatever they want during the month the show is filmed with the hope they would create music together and find love in an unregulated environment.

Host 

 Shin Dong-yup
 Kim Hee-chul
 JeA
 JooE
 Cheetah (Special Host, Episode 5)

Performers 

Female
 Ko Sung-min
 Stella Jang
 Eyedi
 Chahee
 Jang Jae-in

Male
 Deepshower 
 BIGONE 
 Lee Woo
 Choi Nakta 
 Nam Tae-hyun

Rating

References 

2019 South Korean television series debuts
Korean-language television shows
2019 South Korean television series endings